Woodbine was an Ontario provincial electoral district that existed from 1926 to 1967. It covered a section of the eastern city of Toronto east of Jones Avenue and west of Woodbine Avenue. In 1966 there was a major redrawing of the riding boundaries in Toronto and the riding was split. The portion east of Greenwood Avenue was merged into the Beaches—Woodbine and the portion west went into the Riverdale riding.

Boundaries
In 1926 the riding was carved out of the existing riding of Riverdale with the following boundaries. The southern boundary was Lake Ontario. Going north along the west side it formed a line following Knox Avenue all the way to Queen Street East. After short jog east it continued north along Greenwood Avenue until it reached the city limits at Milverton Blvd. The boundary went east following the city limit between Milverton Blvd. and Springdale Blvd. which was in East York. The boundary line turned south at Woodbine Avenue which was followed all the way back to the lake.

Prior to the 1934 election, the riding of Greenwood was dissolved and split between Woodbine to the east and Riverdale to the west. The new western boundary became Jones Avenue from Queen Street East to Danforth Avenue. North of Danforth Avenue the boundary continued along Dewhurst Blvd. and south of Queen Street East the boundary continued along Berkshire Avenue and south to the lake. The boundaries remained until the riding was dissolved prior to the 1967 election.

Members of Provincial Parliament

Election results

1926 boundaries

1934 boundaries

References

Notes

Citations

Former provincial electoral districts of Ontario
Provincial electoral districts of Toronto